The  was the standard machine gun used in tanks and armored vehicles of the Imperial Japanese Army during World War II, a heavy machine gun by infantry forces, This weapon was not related to the Type 97 aircraft machine gun used in several Japanese Navy aircraft including the Mitsubushi A6M Zero, or the Type 97 automatic cannon used as an anti-tank rifle.

Development
Initially, the Type 11 light machine gun was modified by the Army Technical Bureau for use in tanks and other armored vehicles, and was produced for this application under the designation "Type 91 mobile machine gun". However, the basic design issues with the Type 11 remained, including its tendency to jam because of the slightest amount of grit or dirt, and the low lethality and lack of stopping power of its 6.5x50mm Arisaka cartridges.

During the early stages of the Second Sino-Japanese War, Japanese forces captured a number of Czech ZB vz/26 light machine guns from China’s National Revolutionary Army; its numerous design advantages led to the development of the Type 97. This was used in a modified form for armored vehicles until 1940, when the Japanese Army switched to a rimless 7.7 mm cartridge.

Design

The Type 97 was mechanically similar to the Czech ZB vz. 26, with a different stock and pistol grip. It had a straight, vertical, 20-round box magazine and used the same7.7 mm cartridges used in the Type 99 rifle. As with all air-cooled automatic weapons, the gun barrel could easily overheat, which meant the gunner had to fire in bursts, or the barrel would be shot out.

When fitted in a tank, a fixed focus 1.5x telescopic sight with a 30° field of view was used. To prevent injury to the gunner, a rubber eye pad was attached to the rear of the sight.

When used as an infantry weapon, a bipod was employed.

Deployment
The Type 97 came into service in 1937, and it was used on all Japanese tanks and other armored vehicles until the end of the war.  The Imperial Japanese Navy also used the weapon in their combat vehicles, such as the Type 92 Jyu-Sokosha heavy armored car (tankette).

It was much less common as a stand-alone infantry gun due to its weight.  As a result of this weight problem, the similar looking but different internally Type 99 light machine gun was developed in the same caliber and deployed instead.

It was used by communist forces during the Korean War.

See also 

 Bren light machine gun
 Type 96 light machine gun

Notes

References

External links
US Technical Manual E 30-480
Dragonsoffire.com 

Heavy machine guns
Machine guns of Japan
World War II infantry weapons of Japan
World War II machine guns
Military equipment introduced in the 1930s